Banknock railway station served the village of Banknock in Scotland. The station was served by trains on the lines from Kilsyth New to Bonnybridge.

History

Opened by the Kilsyth and Bonnybridge railway in 1888, and absorbed into the North British Railway, it became part of the London and North Eastern Railway during the Grouping of 1923. The station closed along with the line in 1935.

References 

 
  Station marked as closed on 1947 OS map

External links 
 Brief history of the Kilsyth & Bonnybridge Joint Railway 

Disused railway stations in Falkirk (council area)
Railway stations in Great Britain opened in 1888
Railway stations in Great Britain closed in 1935
Former North British Railway stations
1888 establishments in Scotland
1935 disestablishments in Scotland